Jeff Johnson or Jeffrey Johnson may refer to:

Government and politics
Jeff Johnson (Alberta politician) (born 1966/67), current provincial politician and Member of the Legislative Assembly of Alberta
Jeff Johnson (Minnesota politician) (born 1966), former State Representative of Minnesota
Jeff Johnson (Ohio politician) (born 1958), former member of the Ohio Senate
Jeff Johnson (South Carolina politician) (born 1971), member of the South Carolina House of Representatives
Jeffrey W. Johnson (born 1960), former Associate Justice of the California Court of Appeal
Jeff Johnson (BET personality), American political activist and social commentator

Sports
Jeff Johnson (baseball) (born 1966), former Major League Baseball pitcher
Jeff Johnson (Canadian football) (born 1977), Canadian Football League running back with the Toronto Argonauts
Jeff Johnson (footballer) (born 1953), Welsh football player

Arts and entertainment
Jeff Johnson (bass player) (born 1954), American jazz bassist
Jeff Johnson (artist), American comic book artist
 Jeff Johnson, bass player for Jason & the Scorchers from 1981 to 1987
Jeff Johnson (musician) (born 1956), American new-age musician and founder of Ark Records
Jeffrey Johnson (actor) (born 1970), American actor

Other
Jeff Johnson, individual who walked across Australia
Jeffrey T. Johnson, perpetrator of the 2012 Empire State Building shooting